Branibor Debeljkovic (1916-2003) was a Serbian artist, researcher and historian professor of photography at the University of Arts in Belgrade, Serbia. He was a member of the German Society for Photography (DGPh) and the European Society for the History of Photography (ESHPh).

Debeljkovic was born in 1916 in Pristina, Kingdom of Serbia (Now Kosovo). He was the first member-photographer of ULUS (Serbian association of artists) and founder of section of photographers of ULUPUS (Serbian association of artists of applied arts). He was the First Serbian historian of photography.

Debeljkovic was the author of several condensed reviews of history of Serbian photography as well as original works "Old Serbian Photography" (published by Serbian National Library)and the monograph "First Exhibition of Amateurs photographers in Belgrade in 1901". Debeljkovic was the author of numerous exhibitions and texts on photography.

Debeljkovic died in 2003, in Montreal, Quebec, Canada.

References

1916 births
2003 deaths
Artists from Pristina
Academic staff of the University of Arts in Belgrade
Serbian photographers
20th-century Serbian historians
Historians of photography
Photography academics
Yugoslav historians
Yugoslav artists